Shepler's Mackinac Island Ferry is one of two ferry companies serving Mackinac Island, Michigan. The company has docks in Mackinaw City and St. Ignace. Shepler's provides ferry and freight service to Mackinac Island.

History

In 1945, Captain William H. Shepler, a native of Mackinac returned to Michigan after service in World War II. He already had a full captain's license and began to captain the massive (600-person capacity) Algoma, between Mackinaw City and Mackinac Island. He also operated a small snack bar for passengers waiting for the ferry. Capt. Shepler decided to offer a more distinctive service with smaller craft to and from Mackinac Island. In the winter of 1950, he built his own Bay Craft kit boat in Cheboygan, a  cabin cruiser with twin gas engines with a capacity of 24 passengers. The vessel was christened the Miss Margy after Shepler's wife, Margaret.

The Mackinac Bridge was completed in November 1957. During its construction, crowds came to watch the progress, increasing the need for tour boats. During the winter of 1953, he built a second kit boat, a high-speed cruiser, the Billy Dick, named after the captain's son William Richard. The fleet expanded over the years.

Following the decline in ferry traffic across the straits, Shepler purchased beach frontage on Mackinac Island, and constructed a dock to provide service between the island and the mainland.

In May 1988, Capt. William H. Shepler died and his wife Margaret passed away in October 2004. His son, William R., took over the operation with the help of his three children. At that time there were two competitors: Star Line and Arnold's; the latter ceased operations in late 2016.
As of 2019, "Bill" remained the CEO of Shepler's and Chris Shepler was President of the company.

In 2015, the company added a new 85-foot long vessel with a triple engine and 281-person capacity; the new Miss Margy was built in Onaway in Northern Michigan. The vessel has a top speed of about 40 mph. A news report at the time stated that "Sheplers employs 210 with 50 full time and transports 350,000 visitors to Mackinac Island each year". By 2015, the company was running two ferries from St. Ignace, and two from Mackinaw City and had a total of six boats.
The newly expanded dock at Mackinaw City was unveiled in April 2019 at the start of the season.

In addition to the ferry service in 2019, the company was offering  Lighthouse Cruises through the Straits of Mackinac and on Lake Michigan  as well as other sightseeing options. An announcement in June 2019 stated that Shepler's had ordered a $4 million, 210-passenger ferry with four jet drives; this vessel was expected to begin operation the following summer.

Fleet

The Shepler's fleet consists of seven ships:

 The Welcome, built in 1969, 120-person, twin-engine
 Felicity, built in 1972, 150-person, twin-engine
 The Hope, built in 1975, 150-person, twin-engine
 Wyandot, built in 1979, 265 person, twin-engine
 Capt. Shepler, built in 1986, 265-person, twin-engine
 The Senator, built in 1940s (originally the Botany Bay, Put-in-Bay, and Sacre Blue), 25 -person cabin, 300-person deck, twin engine, steel-hulled boat purchased in 1996, updated in the winter of 2013 freight, passenger and ice breaking capabilities.  beam, 99-ton displacement
 Miss Margy, built in 2015, 281-person, triple-engine

The vessels currently in use by Shepler's, with the exception of the Capt. Shepler, The Senator, and Miss Margy, were named after vessels that sailed the Straits area in the late 17th century.

References

Ferry companies of Michigan
Mackinac Island
Transportation in Mackinac County, Michigan